The Confessional Baptist Association is an association of Reformed Baptist churches in the United States. The headquarters is in Mansfield, Texas.

History
On November 12–13, 1996, fifteen Reformed Baptist churches met at Heritage Church in Fayetteville, Georgia to begin the planning of a national association of churches. Four months later on March 11, 1997, the Association of Reformed Baptist Churches of America was founded in Mesa, Arizona. The union was founded in 1997 as the Association of Reformed Baptist Churches of America by 24 member churches from 14 states. In 2022, it is renamed Confessional Baptist Association.

Theology
The association's churches all subscribe to the 1689 Baptist Confession of Faith. The association's General Assembly has noted that their adherence to this Confession means "the model for (association) churches is Puritan and not one of a number of competing contemporary ones."

Theological training
ARBCA founded the Institute of Reformed Baptist Studies (IRBS) at Westminster Seminary California which provides training for seminarians as part of studies toward a Master of Divinity degree program.

Missions
In 2000, ARBCA merged with the Reformed Baptist Mission Services (RBMS), a foreign missions organization. RBMS, though founded 12 years before the ARBCA, now acts as the foreign mission arm of the association.

The association is recognized by the U.S. Department of Defense as an endorsing agency for United States military chaplains.

References

External links
 

Reformed Baptists denominations in North America
Christian organizations established in 1997
Baptist denominations established in the 20th century
Organizations based in Pennsylvania